Fine Fare was a chain of supermarkets which operated in the United Kingdom from 1951 until 1988. Their Yellow Pack budget own-label range, introduced in 1980, was the first own brand basic ranges to be introduced in the UK and in 1983 it was the first supermarket to sell organic food. Fine Fare and its subsidiaries were rebranded to Gateway Foodmarkets in the late 1980s.

History
The company began as one single supermarket in Welwyn Garden City in 1951, as an offshoot of the Welwyn Department Store, owned by Howardsgate Holdings, the company of Ebenezer Howard, the founder of the garden city movement. It was one of a series of convenience store chains established in the 1950s, the others being Premier and Victor Value.

In January 1959, it won a court case against Brighton Corporation, which had insisted that its outlets closed on Wednesday afternoons under the Shops Act 1950. By 1962, it had over two hundred shops.

The company was acquired by Associated British Foods in 1963. ABF appointed James Gulliver to the post of chairman of Fine Fare in 1967; he continued to lead the business until 1972. Seven years after the takeover by Associated British Foods, the turnover had grown from £75 million to £200 million.

In 1974, Fine Fare bought the East Anglian based Downsway supermarket chain, which was owned by the Vestey family business, Union International Group. This added a further eighty stores to the group. Other chains purchased included Burton Supermarkets (Nottingham based), Elmos (East Anglian based), Mercury Market (North East based) and Coopers (Scotland based in 1955).

The business was regularly listed as third in market share behind Sainsbury's and Tesco, and had stores nationwide. They also owned the Melias, and Shoppers Paradise chains of convenience and discount food stores, and moved into the burgeoning DIY industry with their Fix and Fit stores (sold to WHSmith Do It All in 1986). In 1983, Fine Fare became Britain's first supermarket to sell organic foods.

In June 1986, ABF sold the company to The Dee Corporation (subsequently known as Somerfield). Following this, all Dee Corporation's newly acquired stores were either rebranded as Gateway Foodmarkets or closed, meaning the Fine Fare name (including Shoppers Paradise and Melias) disappeared by the end of the 1980s.

Fine Fare sponsored the Scottish Football League for three years from the season of 1985–86 (beginning August 1985) to the season of 1987–88 (which ended in May 1988, around the same time that the last Fine Fare stores closed). The business also advertised on television, the commercials were fronted by the actor Gordon Jackson for a time.

Operations
Fine Fare's depots were at Welwyn Garden City (Hertfordshire), East Kilbride (Lanarkshire), Washington (Tyne & Wear), Cheadle Hulme (Stockport), Hucknall (Nottinghamshire), Tuffley (Gloucester) and Aylesford (Kent). Shoppers Paradise only depots were at East Kilbride (Lanarkshire), Weedon (Northampton), Stevenage (Hertfordshire) and Alton (Hampshire). Washington also held stocks of non food items for national distribution.

In popular culture
Fine Fare is mentioned in the song "Aisle of Plenty" from the album Selling England by the Pound by the progressive rock band, Genesis. It was also the subject of a song by the punk band Toy Dolls called "Nowt Can Compare to Sunderland Fine Fare" from their fourth album Bare Faced Cheek.

References

Defunct supermarkets of the United Kingdom
Companies based in Welwyn Hatfield
Retail companies established in 1951
Retail companies disestablished in 1988
1951 establishments in England
1988 disestablishments in England